Sanne van Dijke (born 21 July 1995) is a Dutch judoka. She is the 2017 and 2021 European gold medalist in the 70kg division. She won one of the bronze medals in the women's 70kg event at the 2020 Summer Olympics in Tokyo, Japan. She is also a two-time bronze medalist in the women's 70kg event at the World Judo Championships (2021 and 2022).

In 2020, she won the silver medal in the women's 70kg event at the European Judo Championships held in Prague, Czech Republic. She also won the silver medal in her event at the 2022 Judo Grand Slam Tel Aviv held in Tel Aviv, Israel.

She won one of the bronze medals in the women's 70kg event at the 2021 World Judo Championships held in Budapest, Hungary. She also won one of the bronze medals in the women's 70kg event at the 2022 World Judo Championships held in Tashkent, Uzbekistan.

On 12 November 2022 she won a silver medal at the 2022 European Mixed Team Judo Championships as part of team Netherlands.

She is openly lesbian and she is in a relationship with Natalie Powell from 2018.

References

External links
 
 
 

1995 births
Living people
Dutch female judoka
People from Bernheze
Judoka at the 2019 European Games
European Games medalists in judo
European Games silver medalists for the Netherlands
Olympic judoka of the Netherlands
Judoka at the 2020 Summer Olympics
Medalists at the 2020 Summer Olympics
Olympic medalists in judo
Olympic bronze medalists for the Netherlands
LGBT judoka
Dutch LGBT sportspeople
Lesbian sportswomen
20th-century Dutch women
21st-century Dutch women
Sportspeople from North Brabant